WSCM may refer to:

 WSCM (FM), a radio station (95.7 FM) licensed to serve Baldwin, Wisconsin, United States
 WSCM-LP, a former low-power radio station licensed to serve Moncks Corner, South Carolina, United States
 World Scout Collectors Meeting